is a Japanese footballer who plays for Hayabusa Eleven FC. His sisters are Japan women's national team players Yuki Nagasato and Asano Nagasato.

He primarily plays as a left-winger but is capable of switching flanks to play on the right. Focused primarily on attacking he runs with the ball well and has an eye for goal, finishing as Avispa Fukuoka's top scorer in the 2010 season with 15 League goals.

Club statistics

References

External links

1985 births
Living people
Association football people from Tokyo
Japanese footballers
Japanese expatriate footballers
J1 League players
J2 League players
Genki Nagasato
Shonan Bellmare players
Tokyo Verdy players
Avispa Fukuoka players
Ventforet Kofu players
FC Tokyo players
Gainare Tottori players
Genki Nagasato
Tokyo United FC players
Japanese expatriate sportspeople in Thailand
Expatriate footballers in Thailand
Association football forwards